is a Japanese animation studio founded in 2011.

Works

Television series
Haitai Nanafa (2012–2013)
Rail Wars! (2014)
Rokka: Braves of the Six Flowers (2015)
Hinako Note (2017)
Citrus (2018)
High School DxD Hero (2018)
Rinshi!! Ekoda-chan (Episode 9) (2019)
Wasteful Days of High School Girls (2019)
Z/X Code reunion (2019)
Interspecies Reviewers (2020)
Higurashi: When They Cry – Gou (2020–2021)
Higurashi: When They Cry – Sotsu (2021)
Mieruko-chan (2021)
Harem in the Labyrinth of Another World (2022)
Love Flops (2022)
Yuri Is My Job! (2023; with Studio Lings)
The Demon Sword Master of Excalibur Academy (TBA)

Original video animation
God Eater Rezo Nantoka Gekijou (2018; with Creators in Pack)
The Island of Giant Insects (2019)
Bean Bandit (2021)

Films
The Island of Giant Insects (2020)

References

External links
Official website 
 

 
Japanese animation studios
Animation studios in Tokyo
Nishitōkyō, Tokyo
Japanese companies established in 2011
Mass media companies established in 2011